Anna Glazkova (born July 29, 1981) is a Belarus rhythmic gymnast. She won a silver medal at the 2000 Summer Olympics.

References 

Olympic gymnasts of Belarus
Olympic silver medalists for Belarus
Olympic medalists in gymnastics
Gymnasts at the 2000 Summer Olympics
1981 births
Living people
Belarusian rhythmic gymnasts
Medalists at the 2000 Summer Olympics
State University of Management alumni
People from Salihorsk
Sportspeople from Minsk Region
20th-century Belarusian women